Precious may refer to:

Music 
 Precious (group), a British female pop group

Albums
 Precious (Chanté Moore album), 1992
 Precious (Conrad Sewell album), 2023
 Precious (Cubic U album), 1998
 Precious (Ours album), 2002
 Precious (Precious album), 2000
 Precious (soundtrack), the soundtrack album to the 2009 film
 Precious (Sogumm album), 2021

Songs
 "Precious" (Depeche Mode song), 2005
 "Precious" (The Jam song), 1982
 "Precious" (Annie Lennox song), 1992
 "Precious" (Pretenders song), 1980
 "Precious" (Vivid song), 2010
 "Precious" (Yuna Ito song), 2006
 "Precious", a song by Jim Jones on the album Pray IV Reign
 "Precious...", a song by Luna Sea on the album Luna Sea
 "Precious", a song by Minipop on the album A New Hope
 "Precious", a 2010 song by Ace of Base

Film and television 
 Precious (film), a 2009 American drama film
 Precious (Passions character), an orangutan in the soap opera Passions
 Precious (Boukenger), fictional artifacts in the Japanese tokusatsu series GoGo Sentai Boukenger
 Cure Precious, one of the Pretty Cures in the Japanese anime series Delicious Party Pretty Cure

Literature 
 "My precious", a reference to the One Ring in the fantasy books The Hobbit and The Lord of the Rings
 Precious Ramotswe, the main character in The No. 1 Ladies' Detective Agency book series
 Precious, a 2009 novel by Sandra Novack

People
 Precious (given name), a list of people with this name
 Paul Ellering (born 1953), American professional wrestling manager who had the ring name "Precious Paul Ellering"
 Precious (wrestling) (born 1955), Canadian professional wrestling valet

Other uses 
 Precious Peaks, three mountains on King George Island in the South Shetland Islands
 Precious, a brand of cheese by Sorrento Lactalis
 Precious metal